Robert Böhm (born 28 March 1988) is a German former professional footballer who played as a goalkeeper.

Career
Böhm was born in Lubliniec, Poland. He went through his youth playing for various German sides, including the youth departments of KFC Uerdingen 05, Borussia Mönchengladbach and Schalke 04. He was signed by Dutch side VVV-Venlo in 2008, from Niederrheinliga side SV Straelen.

He was released by VVV in 2010, but signed by MVV in March 2011, following a lingering injury by first keeper, Cliff Mardulier.

References

1988 births
Living people
People from Lubliniec
German footballers
Association football goalkeepers
SV 19 Straelen players
Eredivisie players
VVV-Venlo players
MVV Maastricht players
German expatriate footballers
German expatriate sportspeople in the Netherlands
Expatriate footballers in the Netherlands